"The Other Woman" is the title track from the album The Other Woman by Ray Parker Jr. It was his first solo hit single without his longtime group, Raydio. Released as a single in March 1982, it peaked at number four on the Billboard Hot 100, number two on the Hot Black Singles chart, number twenty-four on the dance chart, and number thirty-three on the Adult Contemporary chart. It also spent one week at number one in Australia.

Music videos

There are two music videos for the single. One  had a definite cheesy horror film feel, akin to The Rocky Horror Picture Show, with a lyrics-inspired sexy spin on Dracula.

Personnel
Ray Parker Jr. - drums, bass, guitar
Charles Green - saxophone
Ollie E. Brown - percussion
Anita Sherman, Lynn Smith - background vocals

Chart history

Weekly charts

Year-end charts

Certifications and sales

References

1982 debut singles
1982 songs
Ray Parker Jr. songs
Number-one singles in Australia
Songs written by Ray Parker Jr.
Arista Records singles